Frank Thorn or Thorne may refer to:

Frank Thorn (cricketer) (1912–1942) was an Australian cricketer.
Frank Manly Thorn (1836–1907), American lawyer, journalist, and government official
Frank Thorne (1930–2021), American comic book artist-writer
Frank Thorne (bishop) (1892–1981), Anglican colonial bishop in Africa
Frank Thorn (boxer), inducted into the Australian National Boxing Hall of Fame in 2012

See also
Frankie Thorn (born 1964), American actress
Francis Thorne (1922–2017), American composer of contemporary classical music